Pedro Ferrer Andino (born 21 April 1954) is a Puerto Rican sprinter. He competed in the men's 100 metres at the 1976 Summer Olympics.

References

1954 births
Living people
Athletes (track and field) at the 1972 Summer Olympics
Athletes (track and field) at the 1976 Summer Olympics
Puerto Rican male sprinters
Olympic track and field athletes of Puerto Rico
Place of birth missing (living people)